Chindrieux is commune in the Savoie department in the Auvergne-Rhône-Alpes region in south-eastern France.

It lies near Lake Bourget.

Geography

World heritage site
It is home to one or more prehistoric pile-dwelling (or stilt house) settlements that are part of the Prehistoric Pile dwellings around the Alps UNESCO World Heritage Site.

Climate

Chindrieux has a oceanic climate (Köppen climate classification Cfb) closely bordering on a humid subtropical climate (Cfa).

See also
Communes of the Savoie department

References

External links

 Chindrieux photos

Communes of Savoie